TSB Bank Ltd (originally known as the Taranaki Savings Bank) trading as TSB, is a New Zealand bank with headquarters in New Plymouth.  It has 25 branches across the country but is heavily focused on the Taranaki region where 12 of its branches are located.  As of June 2022, it is the seventh largest bank in New Zealand, with a market share in terms of assets of 1.4%.

It provides retail banking and related financial services to individuals and companies.  It was originally one of twelve trustee banks in New Zealand, but when nine banks decided to amalgamate as Trust Bank, TSB Bank stood aside and remained an independent institution and has since expanded its business across the country.  The bank is owned by the Toi Foundation (formerly the TSB Community Trust) which distributes the income it receives from the bank back into the New Zealand community.

TSB also operates TSB Foreign Exchange from 14 branches around the country.

History 
The New Plymouth Savings Bank was established in 1850 and received its first deposit on 28 September 1850 from Waitera te Karei with a deposit of £34. At the time the bank's accountant was paid an annual salary of £20, so the deposit was a considerable sum. Eight years later the bank fell under the auspices of the Savings Bank Act 1858 designed to regulate the savings bank market.

In 1921 a second branch was opened in Fitzroy, and a third in Waitara in 1946. In 1964 the first central Taranaki branch opened in Stratford, combined with a name change to Taranaki Savings Bank.

With the loosening of regulations on banking in the 1970s, the Bank's position was sufficiently sound for it to take maximum advantage of its new found freedom. In 1975, Taranaki Savings Bank was the first bank to offer free, interest-bearing cheque accounts and in 1981 the bank pioneered New Zealand's ATM Cashflow network with one ATM installed in each of the Hawera, Fitzroy, New Plymouth City and New Plymouth City Centre (now TSB Centre) branches.

In 1984 and again in 1986 the bank rejected the branding adopted by the other eleven trustee banks across New Zealand, and in 1988 when the trustee banks were corporatised under the Trustee Banks Restructuring Act 1988 the bank stood aside from the merger into a single Trust Bank, remaining (along with ASB Bank Ltd and Westland Bank) fiercely independent. The savings bank was vested as a limited liability company (under the name Taranaki Savings Bank Limited) on 9 September 1988, nine days after the other 13 trustee banks were vested in their successor companies. In 1989 it changed its name to TSB Bank Ltd.

The Frankleigh Park branch was closed in 2012, the Merrilands branch on 25 July 2014, and the City branch in October 2014. The City branch building was 83 years old but assessed to be an earthquake risk. This building was the bank's former headquarters and still bore the old name "New Plymouth Savings Bank".

In addition to banking TSB Bank Ltd operated TSB Realty from about 1990, with three branches in Ōkato, Bell Block and New Plymouth. Bayleys Taranaki bought TSB Realty in October 2020.

Sponsorship 
TSB Bank sponsors a number of organisations and has naming rights to many of them. Some of these include:
 TSB Bank Wallace Arts Centre, which opened in 2010 at Pah Homestead in Auckland. It houses the James Wallace Art Trust's collection of New Zealand art, which is valued at NZ$50 million.
 TSB Bank Festival of Lights
 TSB Bank New Zealand Surf Festival
 TSB Stadium
 TSB Showplace
 TSB Bank Arena

Ownership 
Ownership of TSB Bank remains vested in the Toi Foundation (formerly named TSB Community Trust,) with all profits staying in New Zealand.

References

External links
 

Banks of New Zealand
Banks established in 1850
New Zealand companies established in 1850
Companies based in New Plymouth